Warner Richmond (born Werner Paul Otto Raetzmann; January 11, 1886 – June 19, 1948) was an American stage and film actor. He began his career as a stock theatre actor and appeared in films in both the silent film and sound eras. His career spanned four decades.  
He is possibly best recalled for appearances in Westerns in his later career in sound films. Between 1912 and 1946, he appeared in more than 140 films.

Early life
Warner Richmond was born in Racine, Wisconsin as Werner Paul Otto Raetzmann, one of seven children born to Wilhelm ("William") Raetzmann and Emilie ("Amelia") Licht. Richmond's father was a German immigrant from Hanover who worked as a printer in Reedsburg. His mother was Wisconsin-born and raised, and of German immigrant parents. Growing up in rural Wisconsin, he became an expert horseman, and this skill would later earn him roles in western movies. As a young man, he moved to Chicago and lived with his brother Ewald and worked as traveling salesman of musical merchandise while pursuing a career as a stage actor.

Career
By the early 1910s, Richmond was working steadily as a travelling stage actor in stock theater. Richmond's only known credited Broadway stage role was in a 1913 production of the Augustus Thomas play Indian Summer, alongside Creighton Hale.

Richmond's first credited film appearance was as the character Dick in the 1912 Ralph Ince directed dramatic short The Godmother for Vitagraph Studios in New York City. By 1917 he was a working consistently as an actor at Solax Studios in Fort Lee, New Jersey. His first appearance in a Western genre film was as the character Dr. Newberry in House Peters' 1915 The Great Divide. When the film industry later relocated to southern California, Richmond and his family also moved and settled in the Los Angeles neighborhood of Toluca Lake. Richmond, who was not a contracted actor, made films with nearly all major film studios and by the late 1910s and early 1920s played both leading and second lead roles in crime dramas, romantic dramas, serials and Westerns. His career as an actor spanned over four decades and he appeared in prominent roles in Westerns, often playing a villain, particularly later in his career during the sound era.  

In 1940, while filming the Albert Herman directed Tex Ritter Western Rainbow Over the Range in Prescott, Arizona, Richmond fell from his horse and suffered a fractured skull which left the left side of his face paralyzed and diminished vision in his left eye. Richmond was hospitalized for eight months following the accident and spend the following two years resting at home and massaging and pinching his face until his reflexes were restored. In 1944, he returned to films.

Personal life and death
Richmond married actress Felice Striker Rose on October 31, 1918. They had a son, Warner Richmond Jr. in 1921. 

In the late 1940s, Richmond retired to the Motion Picture Country Home where he died on June 19, 1948 of coronary thrombosis, aged 62. He was cremated at the Chapel of the Pines Crematory in Los Angeles.

Selected filmography

 The Godmother (1912) - Dick - The Second Boy
 Springtime (1914) - Crawley
 Lady Audley's Secret (1915) - Sir Michael Audley
 The Great Divide (1915) - Dr. Newberry
 Betty of Greystone (1916)
 Her Maternal Right (1916)
 Manhattan Madness (1916) - Jack Osborne
 Fifty-Fifty (1916) - Dandy
 The Sporting Life (1918) - Joe Lee
 Woman (1918) - Civil War Officer
 A Romance of the Air (1918) - Minor Role
 Brown of Harvard (1918) - Claxton Madden
 The Gray Towers Mystery (1919) - Jean Bautiste
 My Lady's Garter (1919) - Meredith
 A Woman's Business (1920) - Brookes
 The Mountain Woman (1921) - Bud Sellers
 The Heart of Maryland (1921) - Tom Boone
 Tol'able David (1921) - Allen Kinemon
 Jan of the Big Snows (1922) - Jan Allaire
 Isle of Doubt (1922) - Gerry Patten
 The Challenge (1922) - Ralph Westley
 The Man from Glengarry (1922) - Ronald MacDonald
 Luck (1923) - Pollard
 Mark of the Beast (1923) - Donald Duncan
 The Speed Spook (1924) - Jud Skerrit
 Daughters of the Night (1924) - Lawyer Kilmaster
 Fear-Bound (1925) - Ed Tumble
 The Crowded Hour (1925) - Operator
 The Making of O'Malley (1925) - Danny the Dude
 The Pace That Thrills (1925) - Jack Van Loren
 The Wives of the Prophet (1926) - Ben Blake
 Good and Naughty (1926) - Bad News Smith
 The Fire Brigade (1926) - Jim O'Neil
 Finger Prints (1927) - Andy 'Annie Laurie' Norton
 Slide, Kelly, Slide (1927) - CliffMacklin
 White Flannels (1927) - Ed
 Irish Hearts (1927) - Emmett
 The Heart of Maryland (1927) - Capt. Fulton Thorpe
 Chicago (1927) - Asst. District Attorney
 Hearts of Men (1928) - William Starke
 The Crowd (1928) - Mr. Sims - John's Father (uncredited)
 You Can't Beat the Law (1928) - Bowery Blackie
 Stop That Man! (1928) - Jim O'Brien
 Shadows of the Night (1928) - Feagan
 The Apache (1928) - Gaston Laroux
 The Voice of the Storm (1929) - Dobbs
 Stark Mad (1929) - First Mate
 The Redeeming Sin (1929) - Lupine
 Strange Cargo (1929) - Neil Stoker
 Little Mother (1929, Short) - Father
 Big News (1929) - Phelps - District Attorney's Man
 Men Without Women (1930) - Lt. Cmdr. Briddwell
 Strictly Modern (1930) - Judge Bartlett
 Billy the Kid (1930) - Bob Ballinger
 Remote Control (1930) - Max
 Quick Millions (1931) - 'Nails' Markey
 Huckleberry Finn (1931) - Pap Finn
 Stung (1931) - Racketeer
 The Woman from Monte Carlo (1932) - Fourdylis
 The Beast of the City (1932) - Tom
 Scarface (1932) - Cesca's Dance Partner (uncredited)
 Night Court (1932) - Ed - Frame-Up Man (uncredited)
 Strangers of the Evening (1932) - Dr. Joseph Chandler
 Hell's Highway (1932) - 'Pop-Eye' Jackson
 Fast Workers (1933) - Feets Wilson
 King of the Jungle (1933) - Gus (uncredited)
 Corruption (1933) - Regan
 The Man Who Dared (1933) - Neighborhood Hood (uncredited)
 Life in the Raw (1933) - Harvey (H.B.) Lamson
 Mama Loves Papa (1933) - The Radical
 Police Call (1933) - Sammy
 This Day and Age (1933) - Defense Attorney
 The Lost Jungle (1934) - Sharkey
 The Scarlet Empress (1934) - Castle Guard (uncredited)
 Gift of Gab (1934) - Cop (uncredited)
 Happy Landing (1934) - Powell
 Fugitive Lady (1934) - Saunders (uncredited)
 The Band Plays On (1934) - Lumberjack (uncredited)
 Under Pressure (1935) - Weasel
 The Phantom Empire (1935) - Rab
 Mississippi (1935) - Man at Bar Who Pulls a Gun (uncredited)
 Straight from the Heart (1935) - Cop (uncredited)
 Smokey Smith (1935) - Kent
 The Headline Woman (1935) - Henchman Bradley
 So Red the Rose (1935) - Confederate Sergeant
 Chinatown Squad (1935) - Detective (uncredited)
 Rainbow's End (1935) - Thomas Stark
 The Last Days of Pompeii (1935) - Captain of the Guard (uncredited)
 The New Frontier (1935) - Ace Holmes
 Remember Last Night? (1935) - Policeman (uncredited)
 The Fighting Marines (1935, Serial) - Metcalf - Henchman
 The Courageous Avenger (1935) - Gorman
 The Singing Vagabond (1935) - Buck LaCrosse
 Heart of the West (1936) - Johnson
 Hearts in Bondage (1936) - Bucko (uncredited)
 Wolves of the Sea (1936) - Snoden
 Below the Deadline (1936) - Diamond Dutch
 Missing Girls (1936) - Ray Hanson
 In His Steps (1936) - Gavin
 White Legion (1936) - Burke
 Song of the Gringo (1936) - Henchman Cherokee
 Headin' for the Rio Grande (1936) - Ike Travis
 Trail of Vengeance (1937) - Link Carson
 The Gold Racket (1937) - Doc Johnson
 A Lawman Is Born (1937) - Kane Briscoe
 The 13th Man (1937) - George Crandall
 Doomed at Sundown (1937) - Jim Hatfield
 Riders of the Dawn (1937) - Jim Danti
 Stars Over Arizona (1937) - Ace Carter
 Where Trails Divide (1937) - Mississippi Blackie Wilson
 Federal Bullets (1937) - Henchman Burke
 Wallaby Jim of the Islands (1937) - Karl Haage, Richter Henchman
 Child Bride (1938) - Jake Bolby
 The Secret of Treasure Island (1938, Serial) - Capt. Tom Stanton, alias Capt. Tom Faxton [Ch.1]
 Flash Gordon's Trip to Mars (1938, Serial) - Zandar
 Six Shootin' Sheriff (1938) - Ace Kendal
 The Singing Cowgirl (1938) - Henchman Garrick
 Prairie Moon (1938) - Mullins
 Wild Horse Canyon (1938) - Travers
 Water Rustlers (1939) - Wiley
 Trigger Smith (1939) - Gallop
 The Oregon Trail (1939, Serial) - General Sherman [Ch.1] (uncredited)
 Fighting Mad (1939) - Henchman Trigger
 Rhythm of the Rio Grande (1940) - Buck
 Pals of the Silver Sage (1940) - Sheriff
 The Golden Trail (1940) - Henchman Chris
 Rainbow Over the Range (1940) - Gene Griffin
 Outlaw Trail (1944) - Judd Hansen
 Colorado Serenade (1946) - Dad Dillon
 Wild West (1946) - Judge Templeton

References

External links

1886 births
1948 deaths
American male film actors
American male stage actors
Male Western (genre) film actors
American male silent film actors
20th-century American male actors
Burials at Chapel of the Pines Crematory
American people of German descent
Male actors from Wisconsin